The 1954 Western Michigan Broncos football team represented Michigan College of Education (later renamed Western Michigan University) in the Mid-American Conference (MAC) during the 1954 college football season.  In their second season under head coach Jack Petoskey, the Broncos compiled a 4–5 record (3–4 against MAC opponents), finished in fifth place in the MAC, and were outscored by their opponents, 186 to 136.  The team played its home games at Waldo Stadium in Kalamazoo, Michigan.

Tackle Les Koster was the team captain. Offensive tackle Jack Kelder received the team's most outstanding player award.

Schedule

References

Western Michigan
Western Michigan Broncos football seasons
Western Michigan Broncos football